Reginald Shepherd (April 10, 1963 – September 10, 2008) was an American poet, born in New York City and raised in the Bronx. He died of cancer in Pensacola, Florida, in 2008.

Biography
Shepherd, African-American and gay, graduated from Bennington College in 1988, and received MFAs from Brown University and the University of Iowa, where he attended the prestigious Iowa Writers Workshop. He subsequently taught at Northern Illinois University and Cornell University. In his last year at the University of Iowa, he received the "Discovery" prize from the 92nd Street Y, and his first collection, Some Are Drowning (1994), was chosen by Carolyn Forché for the Association of Writers & Writing Programs' Award in Poetry.

His other collections include: Red Clay Weather (2011); Fata Morgana (2007), winner of the Silver Medal of the 2007 Florida Book Awards; Otherhood (2003), a finalist for the 2004 Lenore Marshall Poetry Prize; Wrong (1999); and Angel, Interrupted (1996).

He is also the author of A Martian Muse: Further Essays on Identity, Politics, and the Freedom of Poetry (published posthumously in 2010), Orpheus in the Bronx: Essays on Identity, Politics, and the Freedom of Poetry (2007) and the editor of The Iowa Anthology of New American Poetries (2004) and of Lyric Postmodernisms (2008).

His work has been widely anthologized, including in four editions of The Best American Poetry and two Pushcart Prize anthologies. His honors and awards include grants from the National Endowment for the Arts, the Illinois Arts Council, the Florida Arts Council, and the Guggenheim Foundation. His 2008 book of essays, Orpheus in the Bronx, was a finalist for the National Book Critics Circle Award in Criticism.

Books

Poetry
Some Are Drowning (University of Pittsburgh Press, 1994)
Angel, Interrupted (University of Pittsburgh Press, 1996)
Wrong (University of Pittsburgh Press, 1999)
Otherhood (University of Pittsburgh Press, 2003)
Fata Morgana (University of Pittsburgh Press, 2007)
Red Clay Weather (University of Pittsburgh Press, 2011)

Criticism
A Martian Muse: Further Readings on Identity, Politics, and the Freedom of Poetry (Poets on Poetry Series, University of Michigan Press, 2010)
Orpheus in the Bronx: Essays on Identity, Politics, and the Freedom of Poetry (Poets on Poetry Series, University of Michigan Press, 2008)

Anthologies
The Iowa Anthology of New American Poetries (University of Iowa Press, 2004)
Lyric Postmodernisms (Counterpath Press, 2008)

Letters
Song After All: Letters of Reginald Shepherd and Alan Contreras (CraneDance Publications, 2013)

References

External links
 Shepherd's blog

1963 births
2008 deaths
American male poets
Bennington College alumni
Iowa Writers' Workshop alumni
African-American poets
LGBT African Americans
American LGBT poets
American gay writers
20th-century American poets
20th-century American male writers
20th-century African-American writers
21st-century African-American people
20th-century American LGBT people
African-American male writers
Gay poets